National Shooting Center may refer to:
 National Shooting Center (Brazil)
 National Shooting Centre at Bisley, United Kingdom
 National Shooting Center (France)